Agrotikos Asteras Football Club is a Evosmos-based football club, currently playing in Gamma Ethniki. It was founded in 1932 by refugees from Asia Minor.

History
Agrotikos Asteras was founded from Greek refugees from Asia Minor, that formerly lived in Koukloutzas, Smyrni, . The idea of the club's establishment was conceived by a group of teenagers living in Neos Koukloutzas, Thessaloniki and it was assisted by a Greek army officer Dimitris Kodikakis. Its statute was handed to Greek court on 10 January 1930. The most important season for the team's history was 2005-2006, when the club won the trophy of Gamma Ethniki and achieved the semi finals of the Greek Cup. The best players this season were Nikos Kyzeridis and Nikos Sakellaridis.

2005–06 season

League

2005–06 was the most successful season in history of the club. Agrotikos finished 1st in Gamma Ethniki and achieved promotion to Beta Ethniki for the first time in its history. The team had many wins with big scores (5-1 vs. Kavala, 6-0 vs. Polykastro, many times won by 4-0, etc.). It had built many times consecutive wins with producing great football and many goals.

Cup

The entire Greek football world was talking about Agrotikos Asteras. A small team from Euosmos managed to reach the semi-finals of the Greek Cup, creating an amazing underdog story. In the second and third  rounds, Agrotikos knocked out Vyzas Megaron (6-2) and Kastoria F.C. (3-1). In the fourth round, Agrotikos achieved a fantastic victory, winning 5-4 on penalties against Greek giants PAOK FC (90 minutes and extra time finished by 1-1). Another win, this time against Ergotelis (2-0), granted them a spot in the quarter finals, where Agrotikos Asteras played Ethnikos Asteras in a two-leg round. The away match ended 1-1 thanks to a goal by club captain Nikos Kyzeridis, while Agrotikos won the home leg by 4-0 (scorers: Kalliakis, Iordanidis 2, Bekiaris). With an aggregate score of 5-1, Agrotikos Asteras was through to the semi finals! Then, the club drew AEK Athens, the third most decorated club  of the competition. The away leg resulted in a 3-0 defeat (Liberopoulos, Moras and Sapanis scored), while the 1-0 home victory wasn't enough to grant the club from Thessaloniki a place in the final.

Honours
Gamma Ethniki
Winners (3): 2005–06, 2013–14, 2021–22
Delta Ethniki
Winners (1): 1993–94

Players

Current squad

References

External links
 Official website

 
Football clubs in Central Macedonia
Association football clubs established in 1932
1932 establishments in Greece
Gamma Ethniki clubs